David Yates (born June 3, 1980) is an American attorney and politician serving as a member of the Kentucky Senate from the 37th district. Elected in November 2020, he assumed office on January 1, 2021.

Early life and education 
Yates was born in Louisville, Kentucky. He earned a Bachelor of Arts degree in political science from the University of Louisville in 2003 and a Juris Doctor from the Salmon P. Chase College of Law at Northern Kentucky University in 2006.

Career 
Yates began his career as a law clerk for Judge William Bertelsman. From 2006 to 2008, Yates served as an assistant attorney general of Kentucky. He has since worked as a personal injury attorney. Yates served as a member of the Louisville Metro Council from 2010 to 2020. He was elected to the Kentucky Senate in November 2020 and assumed office on January 1, 2021.

References 

Living people
1980 births
People from Louisville, Kentucky
Politicians from Louisville, Kentucky
University of Louisville alumni
Salmon P. Chase College of Law alumni
Northern Kentucky University alumni
Louisville Metro Council members
Democratic Party Kentucky state senators